Marie Georgine Judith Keating  ( Vallee; May 19, 1957 – July 15, 2021) was a Canadian senator, provincial civil servant, and lawyer from the province of New Brunswick, who also had a career in the public service. On January 30, 2020, Keating was nominated by Prime Minister Justin Trudeau to fill the vacant Senate seat in New Brunswick, which had become vacant earlier in the month following the mandatory retirement of former Senator Paul McIntyre.

Career 
Prior to being appointed to the Senate, Keating had served in various capacities with the government of New Brunswick, including as Chief Legislative Counsel, Chief Legal Advisor to the Premier of New Brunswick, the province's First Nations Representative, and a provincial chair of the working group on Truth and Reconciliation. She was the first woman to serve as Deputy Minister of Justice and Deputy Attorney General of New Brunswick. She was also, at the time of her appointment to the Senate, editor-in-chief of the Canadian Bar Association’s Solicitor’s Journal.

Keating died on July 15, 2021, at the age of 64 after a period of declining health.

References

External links 
 

1957 births
2021 deaths
20th-century Canadian lawyers
21st-century Canadian lawyers
21st-century Canadian politicians
Canadian King's Counsel
Canadian civil servants
Canadian senators from New Brunswick
Independent Senators Group
Lawyers in New Brunswick
Politicians from Montreal
University of Ottawa alumni
Université de Moncton alumni